Wyatt Wingfoot is a fictional supporting character appearing in American comic books published by Marvel Comics.

While having no superpowers, he has spent much time in the company of the Fantastic Four due to his friendship with Human Torch, and his relationship with occasional Fantastic Four member She-Hulk. Wingfoot is an excellent athlete, marksman, hand-to-hand fighter, tracker and animal trainer, and has been of timely help in numerous potentially devastating situations.

Publication history

Wyatt Wingfoot first appeared in Fantastic Four #50 (May 1966) and was created by Stan Lee and Jack Kirby. The character was inspired by Olympic athlete Jim Thorpe (1887-1953), who was a member of the Sac and Fox Nation.

Fictional character biography
Wyatt, son of "Big Will" Wingfoot — "the greatest Olympic decathlon star this country ever had!", was born on the fictional Keewazi Indian reservation in Oklahoma. He left to attend college at the equally fictional Metro College in New York City. There, Wingfoot became roommates and friends with Johnny Storm. Wyatt has occasional adventures with Storm and the other members of the Fantastic Four. He accompanied the Fantastic Four to Wakanda, first met the Black Panther, and helped him and the Fantastic Four against Klaw. He assisted in tracking down a "threat" to frightened citizens, which turned out to be the lost canine of the Inhumans, the teleporting Lockjaw. With the Human Torch, he went on a quest to rescue the Inhumans from the "Negative Zone" barrier; he also encountered Prester John. Some time later, alongside the Fantastic Four and the Keewazi tribe, he battled the Tomazooma robot. Wyatt eventually completed his degree and graduated from college to return to the reservation as a teacher.

Before returning to his tribe, alongside the Fantastic Four he battled the Miracle Man. Alongside the Fantastic Four and Agatha Harkness, he battled Annihilus.  Alongside the Human Torch, Wyatt encountered the Hulk and battled Blastaar. Alongside the Fantastic Four, Wyatt battled Doctor Doom. With his tribe, Wyatt was then ensorcelled by the Miracle Man, but was rescued by the Thing and the original Ghost Rider. With his tribe, Wyatt was possessed by the demon Dryminestes, but was restored to normal by the Human Torch and Daimon Hellstrom. Wyatt later helped the Human Torch battle Texas Twister. Alongside the Thing, Ka-Zar, and American Eagle, Wyatt battled Klaw.

After the death of Wingfoot's grandfather, the Keewazi chief, the Council of Elders called on Wyatt to accept the position as tribal chieftain.  At the same time, the alien known as Terminus came to Oklahoma to devour Earth's resources, and the Fantastic Four arrived for battle.  Wyatt met the foursome's new member She-Hulk, and he helped the team battle Terminus. Wingfoot postponed his investiture as chief of the Keewazi, and followed the Fantastic Four instead, returning to New York with Mister Fantastic and She-Hulk.  Alongside the Fantastic Four, he journeyed to an alternate Earth, and helped battle the Warlord. He soon began an intimate relationship with She-Hulk, and helped her confront magazine publisher T.J. Vance. He continued this relationship after she left the team (after the Thing's return) and ended up becoming involved in her adventures as well. He was part of a group of innocent citizens kidnapped by a teleportation beam when S.H.I.E.L.D. went after She-Hulk. He helped her to escape confinement by pressing the appropriate amount of weight onto the pressure-sensitive floor of the cell they were confined in. This was a difficult task as She-Hulk is much larger than his already tall form. This incident was part of an internal power struggle within S.H.I.E.L.D. and to further complicate things, one of the citizens was actually a sentient colony of cockroaches. They went after the corrupt S.H.I.E.L.D. officer in charge, endangering everyone on board and anyone the helicarrier might crash in to. She-Hulk soon neutralized the threat, and Wyatt survived the crash of the helicarrier. Alongside the Fantastic Four, Wyatt then battled Doctor Doom (actually Kristoff). Alongside the Fantastic Four, Wyatt later investigated a temporal zone surrounding Central City, California. Wyatt then attended the wedding of Johnny Storm and Alicia Masters (actually Lyja in disguise). Wyatt later became engaged to She-Hulk; alongside her, he battled Carlton Beatrice, and then broke off the engagement. Wyatt later accompanied Ka-Zar and Shanna the She-Devil back to the Savage Land.

Wyatt joined She-Hulk for some adventures in her own series. There, like many of the cast members, he became aware of his own reality as a fictional being. 

Wingfoot eventually returned to his tribe when they discovered large oil deposits under their land. He helped broker a deal between the United States government and the Keewazi.

Wyatt was briefly seen being interviewed on the news show 'Lateline' about his association with the group.

Wyatt is referred to as one of Johnny Storm's best friends, along with Peter Parker. The two of them held an intervention for Johnny Storm following his loss of powers and subsequent erratic behavior.

Powers and abilities
Wyatt Wingfoot has no superhuman powers. He is a superb athlete, and a highly skilled tracker, animal trainer, horseman, motorcyclist, dancer and marksman. He is also an excellent hand-to-hand combatant.

Wyatt sometimes rides a gyro-cruiser, provided by the Wakanda Design Group.

Other versions

1602
"Lord Wingfoot" appears in the Marvel 1602 miniseries 1602: Fantastick Four as a rival to John Storm for the hand of Doris Evans. According to Storm the man is a "godless brute". At the end of the series, when Mistress Evans has thrown them both over for William Shakespeare, Storm and Wingfoot resolve their differences over a drink.

Last Avengers Story
In one alternate future, Wyatt has married She-Hulk and they have had a child called Jessie. She joins the Avengers to help defeat Ultron.

Earth X
In the alternate future of Earth X, Wyatt has become Captain America's new partner Redwing, named after the Falcon's bird partner and wearing his winged harness. Together they battle the multi-minded alien menace 'Hydra' which has taken many people they both know, including She-Hulk, Sam Wilson himself and Sharon Carter.

Heroes Reborn
During the "Heroes Reborn" company-wide crossover, an alternate-universe analog of Wingfoot was purportedly a government agent assigned to monitor independent spaceflight and extraterrestrial meetings, but was in reality a spy working for that universe's version of Doctor Doom. It turned out later that the spy was the Skrull Kl'rt and the real Wingfoot managed to escape.

In other media

Video games
 Wyatt Wingfoot appears as a non-playable character in the video game Marvel: Ultimate Alliance, voiced by Dave Wittenberg. When in Stark Tower if the player talks to him, he will take the team on the next available mission on the Quinjet. He has a special dialogue with Johnny Storm. When first encountered, he is given the laptop of Black Widow who then hands it to a hacker to try to uncover it. He is never seen again after he takes the team to the Sanctum Sanctorum.

References

External links
 

Characters created by Jack Kirby
Characters created by Stan Lee
Comics characters introduced in 1966
Fantastic Four characters
Fictional characters from Oklahoma
Fictional Native American people
Marvel Comics male characters